Pseudoclema is a genus of beetles in the family Buprestidae, containing the following species:

 Pseudoclema theryi Cobos, 1954
 Pseudoclema transvaalense (Kerremans, 1911)

References

Buprestidae genera